In situ adaptive tabulation (ISAT) is an algorithm for the approximation of nonlinear relationships.  ISAT is based on multiple linear regressions that are dynamically added as additional information is discovered.  The technique is adaptive as it adds new linear regressions dynamically to a store of possible retrieval points.  ISAT maintains error control by defining finer granularity in regions of increased nonlinearity.  A binary tree search transverses cutting hyper-planes to locate a local linear approximation.  ISAT is an alternative to artificial neural networks that is receiving increased attention for desirable characteristics, namely:

 scales quadratically with increased dimension
 approximates functions with discontinuities
 maintains explicit bounds on approximation error
 controls local derivatives of the approximating function
 delivers new data training without re-optimization

ISAT was first proposed by Stephen B. Pope for computational reduction of turbulent combustion simulation and later extended to model predictive control.  It has been generalized to an ISAT framework that operates based on any input and output data regardless of the application. An improved version of the algorithm was proposed just over a decade later of the original publication, including new features that allow you to improve the efficiency of the search for tabulated data, as well as error control.

See also

Predictive analytics
Radial basis function network
Recurrent neural networks
Support vector machine
Tensor product network

References

External links
In Situ Adaptive Tabulation (ISAT) in Turbulent Combustion
Tutorial Overview of ISAT
ISAT-CK7: an implementation in Fortran 90 developed by Turbulence and Combustion Group at Cornell
ISAT-CK7-Cantera: an adaptation of Cornell code to use with Cantera library
CRFlowLib: alternative implementation in C language

Computer networking